Dorcadion scrobicolle is a species of beetle in the family Cerambycidae. It was described by Kraatz in 1873. It is known from Turkey.

Subspecies
 Dorcadion scrobicolle morulum Holzschuh, 1995
 Dorcadion scrobicolle scrobicolle Kraatz, 1873

References

scrobicolle
Beetles described in 1873